Highspeed 4 is a 92,5m high speed catamaran operated by Hellenic Seaways.

History
Highspeed 4 was built by Austal at Henderson, Australia in 2000, on order by Greek ferry operator Minoan Flying Dolphins (MFD).
She entered service with MFD in July 2000, sailing between Piraeus and Cyclades. Since 2005 and following the consolidation of MFD into Hellenic Seaways (HSW), Highspeed 4 operates in the colors of HSW.

References

Ships built by Austal
Ferries of Greece
Individual catamarans
2000 ships